Scandalous John is a 1971 American comedy-drama western film directed by Robert Butler and produced by Walt Disney Productions. It stars Brian Keith and Alfonso Arau. The music was scored by Rod McKuen.

Plot
John McCanless is a rip-snorting, 79-year-old western rancher, together with the prettiest granddaughter; ugliest horse; scrawniest herd; and puniest partner, a Mexican handyman; go on a cattle drive (of one cow) and do battle against a wealthy, land-grabbing industrialist. After an adventurous (and humorous) trek, à la Don Quixote, the rancher confronts the villain in a shootout that parallels the classic struggle of good and evil in the Old West.

Cast
 Brian Keith as John McCanless
 Alfonso Arau as Paco
 Michele Carey as Amanda McCanless
 Rick Lenz as Jimmy Whittaker
 Harry Morgan as Sheriff Pippen
 Simon Oakland as Barton Whittaker
 Bill Williams as Sheriff Hart
 Christopher Dark as Card Dealer
 Fran Ryan as Farm Woman
 Bruce Glover as Sludge
 Richard Hale as Old Indian
 Jimmy Lydon as Grotch
 John Ritter as Wendell
 Iris Adrian as Mavis
 Larry D. Mann as Bartender
 Jack Raine as Switchman
 Booth Colman as Governor Murray
 Edward Faulkner as Hillary
 Bill Zuckert as Abernathy
 John Zaremba as Wales
 Robert Padilla as Paco's Cousin
 Alex Tinne as Clerk
 Benny Baker as Dr. Kropak
 Paul Koslo as Pipes
 William O'Connell as Men's Store Clerk
 Sam Edwards as Bald Man
 Leone Stevens as Girl
 José Nieto as Mariachi Band
 Joseph Gutierrez as Mariachi Band
 Freddie Hernandez as Mariachi Band

References

External links
 

1971 films
1971 comedy-drama films
American comedy-drama films
1971 Western (genre) films
American Western (genre) films
Walt Disney Pictures films
Films directed by Robert Butler
Films produced by Bill Walsh (producer)
Films scored by Rod McKuen
Films based on British novels
1971 comedy films
1971 drama films
1970s English-language films
1970s American films